Študlov may refer to places in the Czech Republic:

Študlov (Svitavy District), a municipality and village in the Pardubice Region
Študlov (Zlín District), a municipality and village in the Zlín Region